The Manhyia Palace (Akan language meaning Oman  – gathering of the people) is the seat of the Asantehene, as well as his official residence. It is located at Kumasi, the capital of the Ashanti Region. The first palace is now a museum. Otumfuor Opoku Ware II built the new palace, which is close to the old one and is used by the current Asantehene, Otumfuor Osei Tutu II.

History 
The palace was built in 1925 by Britain some time after the Third Anglo-Ashanti War in 1874, when the British had demolished the original palace built by Asantes. The British were said to have been impressed by the size of the original palace and the scope of its contents, which included "rows of books in many languages.", but during to the War of the Golden Stool, the British demolished the royal palace with explosives. The palace consequently erected is a kilometre from the Centre for National Culture, Kumasi.

Upon the return from exile of the Asantehene Nana Prempeh I from the Seychelles Islands, the building was offered to him for use as his residence. This was because prior to the Asantehene's exile, his old palace had been burnt down in the Yaa Asentewa War. The war was fought between the British and the Asantes because of the refusal of the Asantehene to offer the Golden stool to the then governor of the Gold Coast. Prempeh I only accepted the offer after he had paid for the cost of the building in full. Two kings lived in the palace, namely Otumfuo Prempeh I and Otumfuo Sir Osei Agyeman Prempeh II, KBE, the 13th and 14th kings of the Asante nation.

The old palace was converted into a museum in 1995 after the new palace was built. Opoku Ware II was the first king to live in the new palace, which he occupied until his death in 1999. The current Asantehene Barima Kwaku Duah popularly called Otumfuor Osei Tutu II, currently resides in the new palace.

Manhyia Palace Museum 
The palace built by the British after the "War of the Golden Stool" (Akan Language "Sika" = Golden stool = "Dwa") was converted into a museum and official opened on 12 August 1995 by the then king, Otumfuo Opoku Ware II. Several artefacts are displayed in the museum. They include furniture used by the Kings, the bronze head of Nana Sir Osei Agyeman Prempeh II, and a sketch map of the Asanteman. There is also Asanteman's first television at the museum, as well as life-sized wax effigies of some of the kings and queens of Asanteman.

Architecture 
The architecture of the palace is akin to the Kingdom of Asante building plans of the early 1900s. The palace is a two-storey building. Both floors have open verandas, giving a view of the palace's environs. In 1995, an outbuilding was added to the original palace to serve as a gift shop. The palace has a large courtyard and it showcases statues of past great kings and queens of the Ashanti.

See also
Ashanti people
Rulers of the Kingdom of Ashanti

References

External links 

Ashanti monarchy
Buildings and structures in Kumasi
Museums in Ghana
Palaces in Africa
Buildings and structures completed in 1925
1920s establishments in Gold Coast (British colony)